

List of representatives 

 Tonga–United States relations

References 

 
United States
Tonga